In biology, chimeric antigen receptors (CARs)—also known as chimeric immunoreceptors, chimeric T cell receptors or artificial T cell receptors—are receptor proteins that have been engineered to give T cells the new ability to target a specific antigen. The receptors are chimeric in that they combine both antigen-binding and T cell activating functions into a single receptor.

CAR T cell therapy uses T cells engineered with CARs to treat cancer. The premise of CAR T immunotherapy is to modify T cells to recognize cancer cells in order to more effectively target and destroy them. Scientists harvest T cells from people, genetically alter them, then infuse the resulting CAR T cells into patients to attack their tumors.

CAR T cells can be derived either from T cells in a patient's own blood (autologously) or from the T cells of another, healthy, donor (allogeneically). Once isolated from a person, these T cells are genetically engineered to express a specific CAR, which programs them to target an antigen that is present on the surface of tumors. For safety, CAR T cells are engineered to be specific to an antigen that is expressed on a tumor but is not expressed on healthy cells.

After CAR T cells are infused into a patient, they act as a "living drug" against cancer cells. When they come in contact with their targeted antigen on a cell's surface, CAR T cells bind to it and become activated, then proceed to proliferate and become cytotoxic. CAR T cells destroy cells through several mechanisms, including extensive stimulated cell proliferation, increasing the degree to which they are toxic to other living cells (cytotoxicity), and by causing the increased secretion of factors that can affect other cells such as cytokines, interleukins and growth factors.

The surface of CAR T cells can bear either of two types of co-receptors, CD4 and CD8. These two cell types, called CD4+ and CD8+, respectively, have different and interacting cytotoxic effects, and it appears that therapies employing a 1-to-1 ratio of the cell types provide synergistic antitumor effects.

History 
The first chimeric receptors containing portions of an antibody and the T cell receptor was described in 1987 by Yoshihisa Kuwana et al. at the Institute for Comprehensive Medical Science in Aichi, Japan, and independently in 1989 by Gideon Gross and Zelig Eshhar at the Weizmann Institute in Israel. Originally termed "T-bodies", these early approaches combined an antibody's ability to specifically bind to diverse targets with the constant domains of the TCR-α or TCR-β proteins.

In 1991, chimeric receptors containing the intracellular signaling domain of CD3ζ were shown to activate T cell signaling by Arthur Weiss at the University of California, San Francisco. This work prompted CD3ζ intracellular domains to be added to chimeric receptors with antibody-like extracellular domains, commonly single-chain fraction variable (scFv) domains, as well as proteins such as CD4, subsequently termed first generation CARs.

A first generation CAR containing a CD4 extracellular domain and a CD3ζ intracellular domain was used in the first clinical trial of chimeric antigen receptor T cells by the biotechnology company Cell Genesys in the mid 1990s, allowing adoptively transferred T cells to target HIV infected cells, although it failed to show any clinical improvement. Similar early clinical trials of CAR T cells in solid tumors in the 1990s using first generation CARs targeting a solid tumor antigens such as MUC1 did not show long-term persistence of the transferred T cells or result in significant remissions.

In the early 2000s, co-stimulatory domains such as CD28 or 4-1BB were added to first generation CAR's CD3ζ intracellular domain. Termed second generation CARs, these constructs showed greater persistence and improved tumor clearance in pre-clinical models. Clinical trials in the early 2010s using second generation CARs targeting CD19, a protein expressed by normal B cells as well as B-cell leukemias and lymphomas, by investigators at the NCI, University of Pennsylvania, and Memorial Sloan Kettering Cancer Center demonstrated the clinical efficacy of CAR T cell therapies and resulted in complete remissions in many heavily pre-treated patients. These trials ultimately led in the US to the FDA's first two approvals of CAR T cells in 2017, those for tisagenlecleucel (Kymriah), marketed by Novartis originally for B-cell precursor acute lymphoblastic leukemia (B-ALL), and axicabtagene ciloleucel (Yescarta), marketed by Kite Pharma originally for diffuse large B-cell lymphoma (DLBCL). There are now six FDA-approved CAR T therapies.

Production 

The first step in the production of CAR T-cells is the isolation of T cells from human blood. CAR T-cells may be manufactured either from the patient's own blood, known as an autologous treatment, or from the blood of a healthy donor, known as an allogeneic treatment. The manufacturing process is the same in both cases; only the choice of initial blood donor is different.

First, leukocytes are isolated using a blood cell separator in a process known as leukocyte apheresis. Peripheral blood mononuclear cells (PBMCs) are then separated and collected. The products of leukocyte apheresis are then transferred to a cell-processing center. In the cell processing center, specific T cells are stimulated so that they will actively proliferate and expand to large numbers. To drive their expansion, T cells are typically treated with the cytokine interleukin 2 (IL-2) and anti-CD3 antibodies.

The expanded T cells are purified and then transduced with a gene encoding the engineered CAR via a retroviral vector, typically either an integrating gammaretrovirus (RV) or a lentiviral (LV) vector. These vectors are very safe in modern times due to a partial deletion of the U3 region. The new gene editing tool CRISPR/Cas9 has recently been used instead of retroviral vectors to integrate the CAR gene into specific sites in the genome.

The patient undergoes lymphodepletion chemotherapy prior to the introduction of the engineered CAR T-cells. The depletion of the number of circulating leukocytes in the patient upregulates the number of cytokines that are produced and reduces competition for resources, which helps to promote the expansion of the engineered CAR T-cells.

Clinical applications 
As of March 2019, there were around 364 ongoing clinical trials happening globally involving CAR T cells. The majority of those trials target blood cancers: CAR T therapies account for more than half of all trials for hematological malignancies. CD19 continues to be the most popular antigen target, followed by BCMA (commonly expressed in multiple myeloma). In 2016, studies began to explore the viability of other antigens, such as CD20. Trials for solid tumors are less dominated by CAR T, with about half of cell therapy-based trials involving other platforms such as NK cells.

Cancer 
T cells are genetically engineered to express chimeric antigen receptors specifically directed toward antigens on a patient's tumor cells, then infused into the patient where they attack and kill the cancer cells. Adoptive transfer of T cells expressing CARs is a promising anti-cancer therapeutic, because CAR-modified T cells can be engineered to target potentially any tumor associated antigen.

Early CAR T cell research has focused on blood cancers. The first approved treatments use CARs that target the antigen CD19, present in B-cell-derived cancers such as acute lymphoblastic leukemia (ALL) and diffuse large B-cell lymphoma (DLBCL). There are also efforts underway to engineer CARs targeting many other blood cancer antigens, including CD30 in refractory Hodgkin's lymphoma; CD33, CD123, and FLT3 in acute myeloid leukemia (AML); and BCMA in multiple myeloma.

Solid tumors have presented a more difficult target. Identification of good antigens has been challenging: such antigens must be highly expressed on the majority of cancer cells, but largely absent on normal tissues. CAR T cells are also not trafficked efficiently into the center of solid tumor masses, and the hostile tumor microenvironment suppresses T cell activity.

Autoimmune disease 
While most CAR T cell studies focus on creating a CAR T cell that can eradicate a certain cell population (for instance, CAR T cells that target lymphoma cells), there are other potential uses for this technology. T cells can also mediate tolerance to antigens. A regulatory T cell outfitted with a CAR could have the potential to confer tolerance to a specific antigen, something that could be utilized in organ transplantation or rheumatic diseases like lupus.

FDA-approved CAR T cell therapies

Safety 
There are serious side effects that result from CAR T-cells being introduced into the body, including cytokine release syndrome and neurological toxicity. Because it is a relatively new treatment, there is little data about the long-term effects of CAR T-cell therapy. There are still concerns about long-term patient survival, as well as pregnancy complications in female patients treated with CAR T-cells. Anaphylaxis may be a side effect, as the CAR is made with a foreign monoclonal antibody, and as a result provokes an immune response.

On-target/off-tumor recognition occurs when the CAR T-cell recognizes the correct antigen, but the antigen is expressed on healthy, non-pathogenic tissue. This results in the CAR T-cells attacking non-tumor tissue, such as healthy B cells that express CD19 causing B-cell aplasia. The severity of this adverse effect can vary but the combination of prior immunosuppression, lymphodepleting chemotherapy and on-target effects causing hypogammaglobulinaemia and prolonged cytopenias places patients at increased risk of serious infections.

There is also the unlikely possibility that the engineered CAR T-cells will themselves become transformed into cancerous cells through insertional mutagenesis, due to the viral vector inserting the CAR gene into a tumor suppressor or oncogene in the host T cell's genome. Some retroviral (RV) vectors carry a lower risk than lentiviral (LV) vectors. However, both have the potential to be oncogenic. Genomic sequencing analysis of CAR insertion sites in T cells has been established for better understanding of CAR T-cell function and persistence in vivo.

Cytokine release syndrome 

The most common issue after treatment with CAR T-cells is cytokine release syndrome (CRS), a condition in which the immune system is activated and releases an increased number of inflammatory cytokines. The clinical manifestation of this syndrome resembles sepsis with high fever, fatigue, myalgia, nausea, capillary leakages, tachycardia and other cardiac dysfunction, liver failure, and kidney impairment. CRS occurs in almost all patients treated with CAR T-cell therapy; in fact, the presence of CRS is a diagnostic marker that indicates the CAR T-cells are working as intended to kill the cancer cells. The severity of CRS does not correlate with an increased response to the treatment, but rather higher disease burden. Severe cytokine release syndrome can be managed with immunosuppressants such as corticosteroids, and with tocilizumab, an anti-IL-6 monoclonal antibody. Early intervention using tocilizumab was shown to reduce the frequency of severe CRS in multiple studies without affecting the therapeutic effect of the treatment.

Immune effector cell-associated neurotoxicity 
Neurological toxicity is also often associated with CAR T-cell treatment. The underlying mechanism is poorly understood, and may or may not be related to CRS. Clinical manifestations include delirium, the partial loss of the ability to speak coherently while still having the ability to interpret language (expressive aphasia), lowered alertness (obtundation), and seizures. During some clinical trials, deaths caused by neurotoxicity have occurred. The main cause of death from neurotoxicity is cerebral edema. In a study carried out by Juno Therapeutics, Inc., five patients enrolled in the trial died as a result of cerebral edema. Two of the patients were treated with cyclophosphamide alone and the remaining three were treated with a combination of cyclophosphamide and fludarabine. In another clinical trial sponsored by the Fred Hutchinson Cancer Research Center, there was one reported case of irreversible and fatal neurological toxicity 122 days after the administration of CAR T-cells.

Chimeric antigen receptor structure 
Chimeric antigen receptors combine many facets of normal T cell activation into a single protein. They link an extracellular antigen recognition domain to an intracellular signalling domain, which activates the T cell when an antigen is bound. CARs are composed of four regions: an antigen recognition domain, an extracellular hinge region, a transmembrane domain, and an intracellular T cell signaling domain.

Antigen recognition domain 
The antigen recognition domain is exposed to the outside of the cell, in the ectodomain portion of the receptor. It interacts with potential target molecules and is responsible for targeting the CAR T cell to any cell expressing a matching molecule.

The antigen recognition domain is typically derived from the variable regions of a monoclonal antibody linked together as a single-chain variable fragment (scFv). An scFv is a chimeric protein made up of the light (VL) and heavy (VH) chains of immunoglobins, connected with a short linker peptide. These VL and VH regions are selected in advance for their binding ability to the target antigen (such as CD19). The linker between the two chains consists of hydrophilic residues with stretches of glycine and serine in it for flexibility as well as stretches of glutamate and lysine for added solubility. Single domain antibodies (e.g. VH, VHH) have been engineered and developed as antigen recognition domains in the CAR format due to their high transduction efficiency in T cells.

In addition to antibody fragments, non‐antibody‐based approaches have also been used to direct CAR specificity, usually taking advantage of ligand/receptor pairs that normally bind to each other. Cytokines, innate immune receptors, TNF receptors, growth factors, and structural proteins have all been successfully used as CAR antigen recognition domains.

Hinge region 
The hinge, also called a spacer, is a small structural domain that sits between the antigen recognition region and the cell's outer membrane. An ideal hinge enhances the flexibility of the scFv receptor head, reducing the spatial constraints between the CAR and its target antigen. This promotes antigen binding and synapse formation between the CAR T cells and target cells. Hinge sequences are often based on membrane-proximal regions from other immune molecules including IgG, CD8, and CD28.

Transmembrane domain 

The transmembrane domain is a structural component, consisting of a hydrophobic alpha helix that spans the cell membrane. It anchors the CAR to the plasma membrane, bridging the extracellular hinge and antigen recognition domains with the intracellular signaling region. This domain is essential for the stability of the receptor as a whole. Generally, the transmembrane domain from the most membrane-proximal component of the endodomain is used, but different transmembrane domains result in different receptor stability. The CD28 transmembrane domain is known to result in a highly expressed, stable receptor.

Using the CD3-zeta transmembrane domain is not recommended, as it can result in incorporation of the artificial TCR into the native TCR.

Intracellular T cell signaling domain 
The intracellular T cell signaling domain lies in the receptor's endodomain, inside the cell. After an antigen is bound to the external antigen recognition domain, CAR receptors cluster together and transmit an activation signal. Then the internal cytoplasmic end of the receptor perpetuates signaling inside the T cell.

Normal T cell activation relies on the phosphorylation of immunoreceptor tyrosine-based activation motifs (ITAMs) present in the cytoplasmic domain of CD3-zeta. To mimic this process, CD3-zeta's cytoplasmic domain is commonly used as the main CAR endodomain component. Other ITAM-containing domains have also been tried, but are not as effective.

T cells also require co-stimulatory molecules in addition to CD3 signaling in order to persist after activation. For this reason, the endodomains of CAR receptors typically also include one or more chimeric domains from co-stimulatory proteins. Signaling domains from a wide variety of co-stimulatory molecules have been successfully tested, including CD28, CD27, CD134 (OX40), and CD137 (4‐1BB).

The intracellular signaling domain used defines the generation of a CAR T cell. First generation CARs include only a CD3-zeta cytoplasmic domain. Second generation CARs add a co‐stimulatory domain, like CD28 or 4‐1BB. The involvement of these intracellular signaling domains improve T cell proliferation, cytokine secretion, resistance to apoptosis, and in vivo persistence. Third generation CARs combine multiple co-stimulatory domains, such as CD28-41BB or CD28-OX40, to augment T cell activity. Preclinical data show the third-generation CARs exhibit improved effector functions and better in vivo persistence as compared to second‐generation CARs.

Research directions

Antigen recognition 
Although the initial clinical remission rates after CAR T cell therapy in all patients are as high as 90%, long-term survival rates are much lower. The cause is typically the emergence of leukemia cells that do not express CD19 and so evade recognition by the CD19–CAR T cells, a phenomenon known as antigen escape. Preclinical studies developing CAR T cells with dual targeting of CD19 plus CD22 or CD19 plus CD20 have demonstrated promise, and trials studying bispecific targeting to circumvent CD19 down-regulation are ongoing.

In 2018, a version of CAR was developed that is referred to as SUPRA CAR, or split, universal, and programmable. Multiple mechanisms can be deployed to finely regulate the activity of SUPRA CAR, which limits overactivation. In contrast to the traditional CAR design, SUPRA CAR allows targeting of multiple antigens without further genetic modification of a person's immune cells.

SMDCs (small molecule drug conjugates) platform in immuno-oncology is an experimental approach that makes possible the engineering of a single universal CAR T cell, which binds with extraordinarily high affinity to a benign molecule designated as fluorescein isothiocyanate (FITC). These cells are then used to treat various cancer types when co-administered with bispecific SMDC adaptor molecules. These unique bispecific adaptors are constructed with a FITC molecule and a tumor-homing molecule to precisely bridge the universal CAR T cell with the cancer cells, which causes localized T cell activation. Anti-tumor activity in mice is induced only when both the universal CAR T cells plus the correct antigen-specific adaptor molecules are present. Anti-tumor activity and toxicity can be controlled by adjusting the administered adaptor molecule dosing. Treatment of antigenically heterogeneous tumors can be achieved by administration of a mixture of the desired antigen-specific adaptors.

CAR T function 
Fourth generation CARs (also known as TRUCKs or armored CARs) further add factors that enhance T cell expansion, persistence, and anti‐tumoral activity. This can include cytokines, such is IL-2, IL-5, IL-12 and co‐stimulatory ligands.

Control mechanisms 
Adding a synthetic control mechanism to engineered T cells allows doctors to precisely control the persistence or activity of the T cells in the patient's body, with the goal of reducing toxic side effects. The major control techniques trigger T cell death or limit T cell activation, and often regulate the T cells via a separate drug that can be introduced or withheld as needed.

Suicide genes: Genetically modified T cells are engineered to include one or more genes that can induce apoptosis when activated by an extracellular molecule. Herpes simplex virus thymidine kinase (HSV-TK) and inducible caspase 9 (iCasp9) are two types of suicide genes that have been integrated into CAR T cells. In the iCasp9 system, the suicide gene complex has two elements: a mutated FK506-binding protein with high specificity to the small molecule rimiducid/AP1903, and a gene encoding a pro-domain-deleted human caspase 9. Dosing the patient with rimiducid activates the suicide system, leading to rapid apoptosis of the genetically modified T cells. Although both the HSV-TK and iCasp9 systems demonstrate a noticeable function as a safety switch in clinical trials, some defects limit their application. HSV-TK is virus-derived and may be immunogenic to humans. It is also currently unclear whether the suicide gene strategies will act quickly enough in all situations to halt dangerous off-tumor cytotoxicity.

Dual-antigen receptor: CAR T cells are engineered to express two tumor-associated antigen receptors at the same time, reducing the likelihood that the T cells will attack non-tumor cells. Dual-antigen receptor CAR T cells have been reported to have less intense side effects. An in vivo study in mice shows that dual-receptor CAR T cells effectively eradicated prostate cancer and achieved complete long-term survival.

ON-switch: In this system, CAR T cells can only function in the presence of both tumor antigen and a benign exogenous molecule. To achieve this, the CAR T cell's engineered chimeric antigen receptor is split into two separate proteins that must come together in order to function. The first receptor protein typically contains the extracellular antigen binding domain, while the second protein contains the downstream signaling elements and co-stimulatory molecules (such as CD3ζ and 4-1BB).  In the presence of an exogenous molecule (such as a rapamycin analog), the binding and signaling proteins dimerize together, allowing the CAR T cells to attack the tumor.

Bispecific molecules as switches: Bispecific molecules target both a tumor-associated antigen and the CD3 molecule on the surface of T cells. This ensures that the T cells cannot become activated unless they are in close physical proximity to a tumor cell. The anti-CD20/CD3 bispecific molecule shows high specificity to both malignant B cells and cancer cells in mice. FITC is another bifunctional molecule used in this strategy. FITC can redirect and regulate the activity of the FITC-specific CAR T cells toward tumor cells with folate receptors.

Economics 
The cost of CAR T cell therapies has been criticized, with the initial costs of tisagenlecleucel (Kymriah) and axicabtagene ciloleucel (Yescarta) being $375,000 and $475,000 respectively. The high cost of CAR T therapies is due to complex cellular manufacturing in specialized good manufacturing practice (GMP) facilities as well as the high level of hospital care necessary after CAR T cells are administered due to risks such as cytokine release syndrome. In the United States, CAR T cell therapies are covered by Medicare and by many but not all private insurers. Manufacturers of CAR T cells have developed alternative payment programs due to the high cost of CAR T therapy, such as by requiring payment only if the CAR T therapy induces a complete remission by a certain time point after treatment.

Additionally, CAR T cell therapies are not available worldwide yet. Europe, China, Australia, Singapore, the United Kingdom are some countries where CAR T cell therapies have been approved. In February 2022 Brazil approved tisagenlecleucel (Kymriah) treatment.

See also 
 Cell therapy
 Checkpoint inhibitor
 Gene therapy
 Immune checkpoint

References

External links 
 CAR T Cells: Engineering Patients' Immune Cells to Treat Their Cancers. National Cancer Institute July 2019

Cancer immunotherapy
Gene therapy
Immune system
Leukemia
Lymphoma
T cells